This list of the prehistoric life of Iowa contains the various prehistoric life-forms whose fossilized remains have been reported from within the US state of Iowa.

Precambrian
The Paleobiology Database records no known occurrences of Precambrian fossils in Alabama.

Paleozoic

Selected Paleozoic taxa of Iowa

 †Acidaspis
  †Actinocrinites
 †Actinocrinites gibsoni
 †Actinocrinites lowei
 †Agassizodus
 †Agassizodus variabilis
 †Aglaocrinus
 †Amplexus
 †Anataphrus
 †Anomphalus
 †Archaeogastropod
 †Arctinurus
 †Athyris
 †Athyris fultonensis – or unidentified comparable form
  †Atrypa
 †Atrypa reticularis
 †Atrypa reticularus
 †Aviculopecten
 †Bellerophon
 †Bembexia
 †Bothriocidaris
  †Bumastus
 †Calymene
 †Camarotoechia
 †Camarotoechia chouteauensis
 †Camarotoechia tuta
 †Cardiola
  †Catenipora
 †Ceratocephala
 †Ceratopsis
 †Ceraurus
 †Charactoceras
  †Cheirurus
 †Chomatodus
 †Chomatodus inconstans
 †Chonetes
 †Chonetes glenparkensis
 †Chonetes illinoisensis
 †Chonetes logani
 †Chonetes multicosta
 †Chonetes ornatus
 †Cleiothyridina
 †Cleiothyridina incrassata – or unidentified comparable form
 †Cleiothyridina sublamellosa
 †Climacograptus
 †Coenites
  †Composita
 †Composita humilis – tentative report
 †Composita trinuclea
 †Conocardium
 †Coolinia
 †Cornulites
 †Crania
 †Crotalocrinites
 †Curtognathus
 †Cyathocrinites
 †Cyclonema
 †Cyphaspis
 †Cypricardinia
 †Cyrtolites
  †Cyrtospirifer
 †Cyrtospirifer whitneyi
 †Cystodictya
  †Dalmanites
 †Decadocrinus
 †Deiphon
 †Deltaherpeton – type locality for genus
 †Dentalium
 †Dicoelosia
 †Dimerocrinites
 †Diplograptus
 †Diplograptus modestus – or unidentified comparable form
 †Discosorus
 †Earlandia
  †Edestus
 †Edmondia
 †Eldredgeops
 †Eldredgeops rana
 †Ellesmeroceras
 †Encrinurus
  †Endoceras
 Eocaudina
 †Eodictyonella
 †Eophacops
 †Eospirifer
 †Eospirifer radiatus
 †Eucalyptocrinites
 †Euomphalus
 †Favosites
 †Fenestella
  †Flexicalymene
 †Goniatites
 †Gravicalymene
 †Greenops
 †Grewingkia
 †Gyroceras
  †Hallopora
 †Halysites
 †Harpidium
 †Heliophyllum
 †Hexagonaria
 †Hindia
 †Holopea
 †Huronia
 †Hyolithes
 †Icriodus
 †Idiognathodus
  †Iniopteryx
 †Iniopteryx rushlaui
 †Iocrinus
 †Isotelus
 †Kayoceras
 †Kionoceras
 †Krausella
 †Leptopora
 †Lingula
  †Manticoceras
 †Marsupiocrinus
  †Meristella
 †Meristina
 †Michelia
 †Michelinoceras
 †Murchisonia
 †Mycterops
 †Mystrocephala
 †Naticopsis
 †Naticopsis depressa – type locality for species
 †Neospirifer
 Nucula
 †Odontopleura
  †Onychodus
 †Orthoceras
 †Oulodus
 †Ozarkodina
 †Pachyphyllum
 †Paladin
 †Palmatolepis
  †Peachocaris
 †Pentamerus
 †Pentremites
 †Periechocrinus
  †Petalodus
 †Phacops
 †Phillipsia
 †Pinnocaris
 †Plaesiomys
 †Platyceras
 †Platycrinites
 †Platystrophia
 †Plectodonta
  †Pleurocystites
 Pleurotomaria – tentative report
 †Plicochonetes
 †Poleumita
 †Polygnathus
 †Polygnathus parawebbi
 †Polygnathus xylus
 †Posidonia
 †Proetus
  †Ptyctodus
 †Rhynchodus
 †Rigidella
 †Scutellum
  †Scytalocrinus
 †Septemchiton
 †Sigournea – type locality for genus
 †Sigournea multidentata – type locality for species
 †Similodonta
 †Skenidioides – tentative report
 †Sowerbyella
 †Sphenothallus
 †Spirifer
 †Spirifer louisianensis
 †Spiriferina
 Spirorbis
 †Spyroceras
  †Stethacanthus
 †Streptognathodus
 †Strophomena
 †Strophomena costata
 †Strophomena erratica
 †Stylonema – tentative report
 †Syringopora
 †Taxocrinus
 †Tranodis
 †Whatcheeria – type locality for genus
 †Worthenia
 †Youngia

Mesozoic
 †Arcellites
 †Arcellites crillensis – type locality for species
 †Arcellites disciformis
 †Balmeisporites
 †Balmeisporites auriculata – type locality for species
 †Chrysotheca
 †Chrysotheca dakotaensis – type locality for species
 †Chrysotheca diskoensis
 †Chrysotheca levis
 Coptothyris
 †Coptothyris dakotaensis – type locality for species
 †Dunveganoceras
 †Dunveganoceras pondi
  †Inoceramus
 †Inoceramus ginterensis
 †Inoceramus perfragilis
 †Inoceramus prefragilis
 †Metengonoceras
 †Metengonoceras acutum
 †Microcarpolithes
 †Microcarpolithes hexangulata
 †Minerisporites
 †Minerisporites mirabilis
 †Molaspora – type locality for genus
 †Molaspora lobata
 †Molaspora rugosa – type locality for species
 †Perotrilites
 †Perotrilites bursatus – type locality for species
 †Perotrilites convolutus – type locality for species
 †Pilularia
 †Pilularia globulifera
 †Regnellidium
 †Regnellidium diphyllum
 †Spermatites
 †Spermatites ellipticus
 †Spermatites elongatus

Cenozoic

 Blarina
  †Camelops
 Canis
 †Canis latrans
 †Canis lupus
 Castor
 †Castor canadensis
 †Castoroides
 †Castoroides ohioensis
 Didelphis
 Equus
 †Euceratherium – tentative report
 †Euceratherium collinum
 Geomys
 Lepus
 Lontra
 †Lontra canadensis
 †Mammut
 †Mammut americanum
 †Mammuthus
  †Mammuthus primigenius
  †Megalonyx
 †Megalonyx jeffersonii
 Microtus
 †Microtus paroperarius
 Mictomys
 †Mictomys meltoni
 Odocoileus
 Ondatra
 Panthera
 †Paramylodon
 †Paramylodon harlani
  †Platygonus
 Procyon
 Rangifer
 Sciurus
 Sorex
 †Sorex dispar – or unidentified comparable form
  †Stegomastodon
 †Stegomastodon aftoniae – type locality for species
 Sylvilagus
 Taxidea
 †Taxidea taxus
 Ursus
 †Ursus americanus
 Vulpes

References
 

Iowa